Ivan Namme   is a Cameroonian movie actor, producer and a journalist He is the CEO of Nam Productions & producer of films such as "Smokescreen" (2016), "Barefoot On Broken Bottles"(2015, and "A Little Lie a Little Killed"(2014) In 2017, his film "A little lie A little at the Cameroon movie Achievement Awards.

Career
Namme's International debut was (Before The Sunrise) with Nollywood actors in 2006 who came to Buea for the project, where he was head of communications. He did projects with Nigerian stars such has Fred Amata, Olu Jacobs and Dakore Egbuson. In 2017 he was listed among the top 10 Cameroonian Actors by Bareta news, Ivan, was nominated again for best dress actor by Cameroon fashion award (CFA) in men category.

Selected filmography 
 Barefoot on Broken Bottles (2016)
 Before the Sunrise (2006)
 Rumble tv series (2015)
Smoken screen (2015)

Awards and recognition

See also 
List of Cameroonian Actors
Cinema of Cameroon

References

External links
 

Cameroonian film producers
Living people
Cameroonian film directors
Cameroonian male actors
1978 births